Gun Röring (17 June 1930 – 17 March 2006) was a Swedish gymnast and Olympic champion. 

Röring competed at the 1952 Summer Olympics in Helsinki where she received a gold medal in Team portable apparatus.

References

External links
 

1930 births
2006 deaths
Gymnasts at the 1952 Summer Olympics
Olympic gymnasts of Sweden
Olympic gold medalists for Sweden
Olympic medalists in gymnastics
Swedish female artistic gymnasts
Medalists at the 1952 Summer Olympics
20th-century Swedish women